is a Japanese football defender who plays for JEF United Ichihara Chiba.

Club statistics
Updated to 23 February 2019.

1Includes Japanese Super Cup, FIFA Club World Cup and J. League Championship.

Honours
Kashima Antlers
J1 League (1): 2016
Emperor's Cup (1): 2016
J. League Cup (2): 2012, 2015
Suruga Bank Championship (2): 2012, 2013
Japanese Super Cup (1): 2017
 AFC Champions League (1): 2018

References

External links

Profile at Kashima Antlers

1993 births
Living people
Association football people from Shizuoka Prefecture
Japanese footballers
J1 League players
J2 League players
J3 League players
Kashima Antlers players
J.League U-22 Selection players
JEF United Chiba players
Association football defenders